Tsedenia Gebremarkos (Amharic: ፀደንያ ገብረማርቆስ, born 1972 Ethiopian Calendar or 1979/1980 in Western Calendar) is an Ethiopian singer and songwriter. Referenced in popular culture, Tsedenia received  Kora Award for the 2004 single "Ewedhalehu" and led her to global interconnection with prominent singers. She is known for pop genre while also performing  Ethiopian music and predominantly sings in English and Amharic languages.

She also sang two songs on the album Punt (Made in Ethiopia) by Invisible System released on Harper Diabate Records and produced by Dub Colossus cousin Dan Harper.

Tsedenia also released "Yefikir Girma" in 2015, becoming the most successful hit.

Life and career
Tsedenia Gebremarkos was born in 1972 Ethiopian Calendar [1979/1980 in Western Calendar] in Addis Ababa, Ethiopian Empire. Tsedenia began her career after releasing debut album Bisetegn in 2004. The song "Neh Yelijinete" is header of the album, recounts her love story. She shared the Kora Awards under the best East African female artist category in 2004 by her song "Ewedhalehu", with Achien'g Abura (Kenya) for her song "Toto Wangu". Tsedenia has worked with the Ethiopian dub band Dub Colossus.  They released an EP, A Town Called Addis in June 2008 through Real World Records and a full length LP album of the same name was released in August 2008 exclusively through the Bowers & Wilkins Music Club.

Tsedenia influenced by variety musicians, including Phil Collins and The Beatles. She also cited Whitney Houston as early influence, where she used to sing all her tracks. In 2010, she released a song titled "Hememe".

In 2015, she released "Yefikir Girma", based on rural background. It became the most successful hit and viewed by users in YouTube. The album of the same name was released in 2016. She was awarded one AFRIMA Award for soundtrack of 2015 film Hareyet, with the song "Yet Biye". Her upcoming album is to be set with writing is belonged to Yilma Gebreab where Getnet Enyew Adibuara and Fasil Kebede credited as assistant songwriters.

Personal life
Tsedenia was born and lives in Addis Ababa. She is the mother of two twin children.

Awards and nominations

Discography 
Studio album
 Bisetegn (2004)
 Yefikir Girma (2016)
EPs
  A Town Called Addis (2008, with Dub Colossus)

Filmography 
 Motherland (2010)

References

External links
 Tsedenia Gebremarkos live in Addis Ababa (EthioTube Video)

1972 births
Living people
20th-century Ethiopian women singers
21st-century Ethiopian women singers
Pop singers
Amharic-language singers
Musicians from Addis Ababa